The Firemen's Ball (or The Fireman's Ball;  - "Fire, my lady") is a 1967 comedy film directed by Miloš Forman. It is set at the annual ball of a small town's volunteer fire department, and the plot portrays a series of disasters that occur during the evening. The film uses few professional actors – some characters are played by the firemen of the small town where it was filmed.  By portraying the prevailing corruption of the local community and the collapse of even well-intentioned plans, the film satirized the communist system.

The Firemen's Ball was the last film Forman made in his native Czechoslovakia before he relocated to the United States. It is also the first film he shot in color, as well as a milestone of the Czechoslovak New Wave.

Plot
The bumbling volunteer fire department in a small Czechoslovak town organizes a ball in the town hall, including a raffle and a beauty pageant. The firefighters also plan to present a small ceremonial fire axe as a birthday gift to their retired chairman, who has cancer (although they believe he does not know it himself as doctors were forbidden from revealing terminal illnesses to their patients). During preparations for the ball, a man sets a banner ablaze and finds himself dangling from the rafters of the town hall when his colleagues allow his ladder to fall.

Raffle prizes start disappearing: a cake, a bottle of cognac, a head cheese, a chocolate ball. Josef, one of the firefighters, sees the prizes are missing, but no one admits to knowing anything about the thefts; he eventually finds out that even his wife is involved. During the ball, a bickering committee of firefighters looks for candidates for the beauty contest, but they have difficulty finding enough of them. A man buys drinks for the committee members to persuade them to include his homely daughter among the candidates. An amorous couple paw each other under the raffle table.

After much trouble, seven contestants for the pageant are found. They are told that the winner will present the gift to the chairman after the contest, and the committee instructs them in how to pose and walk. However, when the contest begins, the girls flee from the hall and lock themselves in the bathroom. Consequently, the crowd starts dragging replacement candidates to the stage and a melee ensues. An old woman is crowned the winner and the audience cheers.

A siren sounds because the house of an old man, Mr. Havelka, is on fire. Everyone uses the opportunity to leave the town hall without paying for their drinks. With their fire engine stuck in the snow, the firefighters manage to save some furniture and animals from the house, but they are unable to do anything about the fire with only a few shovelsful of snow. A table is borrowed from Havelka and used to sell more alcohol to the crowd that is watching the fire.

To help Havelka, who has lost almost everything, people donate their raffle tickets. However, nearly all of the prizes have been stolen during the ball, leaving only a few low-value items. The firefighters announce they will turn off the lights to give the thieves an opportunity to return the prizes. In the darkness all of the remaining items are also stolen, and when the lights come back on, Josef is caught returning the head cheese his wife stole. The firefighters' committee retreats to discuss how to save the reputation of the department. They return to a now-empty hall, where only their retired chairman remains. The committee presents him the gift box and he gives a heartfelt speech thanking them, but when the box is opened, it turns out that the axe itself has also been stolen.

The next morning, outside in the snow, Havelka lies down in his bed next to the fireman set on guard beside the ruins of his home.

Cast

Background 

After the success of Loves of a Blonde (1965), Forman, along with fellow screenwriters Ivan Passer and Jaroslav Papoušek, could not concentrate on their follow-up screenplay and so went to the small north Bohemian town of Vrchlabí to hole up in a hotel and concentrate on writing.  "One evening, to amuse ourselves, we went to a real firemen's ball" Forman recalls.  "What we saw was such a nightmare that we couldn't stop talking about it. So we abandoned what we were writing on to start this script."

The movie was shot in a typical local Palace of Culture, "Na střelnici" in Vrchlabí. Most of the actors were not professional actors (e.g. Josef Šebánek, Milada Ježková). To shoot the natural sound of their voices it was necessary to have silence on-set, so during the actors' dialogue scenes the band merely pretended to play and the dancing couples wore woollen socks or slippers.

Controversy 
Forman has commented on the issue of whether his film should be seen as an allegory of the larger society of the time:

The film generated considerable controversy on its release.  Among other things, fire companies across Czechoslovakia protested that the film was an attack on their integrity, to the extent that Forman and his team felt obliged to tour the country dispelling this literal reading. The Czechoslovak Communist party members took exception to the film's cynical tone. However, the film became a big hit in Czechoslovak cinemas, selling over 750,000 tickets.

Carlo Ponti, the film's Italian producer, also took umbrage at the film and pulled his financing, leaving Forman to face a possible 10-years' imprisonment for "economic damage to the state". Forman drove from London to Paris to see Claude Lelouch, who had once promised he would buy international rights for any film Forman made, only to find out Lelouch was in Morocco at that time. By chance, Forman met with Claude Berri, who contacted François Truffaut, and after watching the film they both agreed to buy the international rights.

Though the film did have a domestic release, and was shown in Czechoslovak cinemas in the reformist atmosphere of the Prague Spring, the film was subsequently banned after the invasion of Czechoslovakia by the Warsaw Pact countries in 1968.

Awards
The film was nominated for Best Foreign Language Film at the 41st Academy Awards. It was also listed to compete at the 1968 Cannes Film Festival, but that festival was cancelled due to the events of May 1968 in France.

Home media
Arrow Films released the film on Blu-ray in the UK in 2015.

See also
 List of submissions to the 41st Academy Awards for Best Foreign Language Film
 List of Czechoslovakia submissions for the Academy Award for Best Foreign Language Film

References

External links

 
The Firemen's Ball an essay by J. Hoberman at the Criterion Collection

1968 films
Czechoslovak comedy films
Films directed by Miloš Forman
1960s Czech-language films
1960s black comedy films
Films about firefighting
Czech black comedy films
Films with screenplays by Ivan Passer
Films with screenplays by Miloš Forman
Films shot in the Czech Republic
1968 comedy films
1967 comedy films
1967 drama films
1967 films
1968 drama films